Pelham  is a town in Hillsborough County, New Hampshire, United States. The population was 14,222 at the 2020 census, up from 12,897 at the 2010 census.

History 
Pelham was split from Old Dunstable in 1741, when the border between Massachusetts and New Hampshire was settled. It was incorporated in 1746. The town is named after Thomas Pelham-Holles, 1st Duke of Newcastle.

Geography 
Nearly all of the town is drained by Beaver Brook, which flows south to the Merrimack River in Lowell, Massachusetts. Small sections of town along its eastern border are drained by other minor tributaries of the Merrimack.

This point is  due north of Pawtucket Falls in Lowell, and marks the point where the straight-line border to the west meets the 3-mile buffer defined by the Merrimack River.

In addition to being New Hampshire's southernmost town, Pelham is the easternmost town in Hillsborough County.

Adjacent municipalities 
 Windham, New Hampshire (north)
 Salem, New Hampshire (northeast)
 Methuen, Massachusetts (east)
 Dracut, Massachusetts (south)
 Tyngsborough, Massachusetts (southwest)
 Hudson, New Hampshire (west)

Demographics 

The earliest census data shows the town of Pelham having a population of 543 residents in 1767.

As of the census of 2000, there were 10,914 people, 3,606 households, and 2,982 families residing in the town.  The population density was 412.9 people per square mile (159.4/km).  There were 3,740 housing units at an average density of 141.5 per square mile (54.6/km).  The racial makeup of the town was:
 97.34% White (U.S. average: 75.1%)
 0.44% African American (U.S. average: 12.3%)
 0.22% Native American (U.S. average: 0.1%)
 1.04% Asian (U.S. average: 3.6%)
 0.25% from other races (U.S. average: 5.5%)
 0.71% from two or more races (U.S. average: 2.4%)

Hispanic or Latino of any race were 0.96% of the population. (U.S. average: 12.5%)

In 2000, there were 3,606 households, with an average household size of 3.03 and an average family size of 3.33.
 43.6% of households had children under the age of 18 living with them. (U.S. average: 32.8%)
 71.8% were married couples living together. (U.S. average: 51.7%)
 7.5% had a female householder with no husband present. (U.S. average: 12.2%)
 17.3% were non-families. (U.S. average: 31.9%)
 12.9% of all households were made up of individuals. (U.S. average: 25.8%)
 5.7% had someone living alone who was 65 years of age or older. (U.S. average: 9.2%)

In 2000, the town's population had a median age of 36 years (U.S. average: 35.3).
 28.9% under the age of 18
 6.1% from 18 to 24
 34.0% from 25 to 44
 23.2% from 45 to 64
 7.8% who were 65 years of age or older

For every 100 females, there were 98.8 males.  For every 100 females age 18 and over, there were 99.3 males.

The median income for a household in the town was $68,608. (U.S. average: $41,994). The median income for a family was $73,365. (U.S. average: $50,046). Males had a median income of $47,685 versus $33,375 for females.  The per capita income for the town was $25,158.  About 1.6% of families (U.S. average: 9.2%) and 3.0% of the population (U.S. average: 12.4%) were below the poverty line, including 3.1% of those under age 18 and 4.7% of those age 65 or over.

Education

Public schools are managed by the Pelham School District, School Administrative Unit #28, whose boundaries are coterminous with the boundaries of the town. The Superintendent is Chip McGee.

The schools in the district are:
 Pelham Elementary School
Principal: Jessica VanVranken
Assistant Principal: Kelly LaBonte
Interim Assistant Principal: Kerry Struth
 Pelham Memorial School
Principal: Stacy Maghakian
Assistant Principal: Katrina Mackey
 Pelham High School
Principal: Dawn Mead
Assistant Principal: Adam Barriere

St. Patrick School was at one time a parochial school in the town.

Pelham government 
Pelham is governed by a board of selectmen:
 Robert Haverty, Chair (2023)
 Doug Viger, Vice-Chair (2024)
 Harold (Hal) Lynde (2022)
 Kevin Cote (2022)
 Jaie Bergeron (2023)

Transportation
Pelham is crossed by three New Hampshire state routes:
 NH 38 enters the town from the south at the Massachusetts border, and curves to the northeast, exiting the town into Salem. It follows Bridge Street through town, and serves as the commercial hub of Pelham.
 NH 111A begins at a junction with NH 128 just north of the Massachusetts border, going primarily northeast, exiting the town into Windham. It is known as Marsh Road and Windham Road within Pelham.
 NH 128 is part of the larger Mammoth Road which connects Lowell, Massachusetts, to Hooksett, New Hampshire. It enters the town from the Massachusetts border and goes due north, along the western edge of the town, before exiting the town into Windham.

Pelham appears on that highway's signs for Exit 2.

Pelham has no air or rail transport within the town limits. The nearest commercial airport is Manchester–Boston Regional Airport along the border of Londonderry and Manchester. The nearest rail service is the Lowell Line of the MBTA Commuter Rail which can be accessed at the Charles A. Gallagher Transit Terminal in Lowell. The nearest Amtrak station is Haverhill Station in Haverhill, Massachusetts.

Parks

Muldoon Park 

The park is located northwest of the center of Pelham at 305 Mammoth Road (NH 128), just north of Nashua Road. The park's land area is surrounded by NH 128, two roads that branch off it, and a minor road which intersects NH 111A.

Muldoon Park offers many short walking trails, four variously sized baseball fields (ranging from t-ball to official), a soccer field, and a play area. Most of the trails lead to the park's two ponds, local roads and houses or to Beaver Brook, a small river. The town of Pelham completed an 18-hole disc golf course here, stretching over a quarter-mile, in September 2007.

The Pelham Parks and Recreation department has recently added two non-official sized baseball fields to the southwest corner of the park.

There is now an 18-hole disc golf course at this park, that includes a spot to hold gatherings. Many players from surrounding towns enjoy a round of disc golf set in the woods adjacent to the sport fields.

Notable people 

 Josiah Butler (1779–1854), US congressman
 Sean Caisse (born 1986), stock car driver
 Ray Fox (1916–2014), crew chief and owner with NASCAR
 Daniel Gage (1828–1901), the "Ice King of Lowell"; family for whom Gage Hill is named
 Nick Groff (born 1980), paranormal investigator; graduate of Pelham High School (1999)
 Richard M. Linnehan (born 1957), astronaut (NASA); graduate of Pelham High School (1975)

References

External links 
 
 New Hampshire Economic and Labor Market Information Bureau Profile

 
Towns in Hillsborough County, New Hampshire
Towns in New Hampshire
1741 establishments in New Hampshire